Graphium illyris, the cream-banded swordtail, is a forest butterfly of the swallowtail family (Papilionidae). It is native to the Afrotropical realm.

Description
The markings of the upper surface yellow; the median band curved slightly basad at the costal margin of the forewing and without spot in cellule 7; the tail of the hindwing only white at the extreme tip; the hindwing with red-yellow marginal lunules. Ashanti to the Congo. — ab. (var. ?) flavisparsus Fruhst. has the submarginal spots of the hindwing and the red spots on the under surface larger than in the normal form. Island of Fernando Po.

Habitat
Tropical and subtropical ecoregions.

Status and biology
It is an uncommon to rare species and is seasonal in West Africa (with adults on wing mainly in February and March).  Males mud-puddle, and are attracted to rotten fish as well as perspiration on humans.

Subspecies
G. i. illyris (Sierra Leone, Liberia, Ivory Coast, C.Ghana)
G. i. flavisparsus (Fruhstorfer, 1903) (Equatorial Guinea)
G. i. girardeaui (Guilbot & Plantrou, 1978) (Central African Republic)
G. i. hamatus (Joicey & Talbot, 1918) (Nigeria, Cameroon, Equatorial Guinea, Gabon, Congo, Congo Republic, Tanzania)

Taxonomy
Graphium  illyris is a member of the  antheus - clade Graphium antheus, Graphium colonna, Graphium evombar , Graphium kirbyi, Graphium junodi, Graphium polistratus,  Graphium illyris, Graphium gudenusi).

See also
Upper Guinean forests

References

Sources
Guilbot, R. and Plantrou, J. (1978). Note sur Graphium illyris (Hewitson) et revision systematique de I'espece. Bulletin de la Societe Entomologique de France 83: 68–73.
Smith, C.R. & Vane-Wright, R.I. 2001  A review of the Afrotropical species of the genus Graphium (Lepidoptera: Rhopalocera: Papilionidae) Bull. Nat. Hist. Mus. Ent. Ser. 70 (2): 503-719

illyris
Butterflies of Africa
Butterflies described in 1873
Taxa named by William Chapman Hewitson